In enzymology, a kaempferol 4'-O-methyltransferase is an enzyme that catalyzes the chemical reaction

S-adenosyl-L-methionine + kaempferol  S-adenosyl-L-homocysteine + kaempferide

Thus, the two substrates of this enzyme are S-adenosyl methionine and kaempferol, whereas its two products are S-adenosylhomocysteine and kaempferide.

This enzyme belongs to the family of transferases, specifically those transferring one-carbon group methyltransferases.  The systematic name of this enzyme class is S-adenosyl-L-methionine:kaempferol 4'-O-methyltransferase. Other names in common use include S-adenosyl-L-methionine:flavonoid 4'-O-methyltransferase, and F 4'-OMT.

References 

 

EC 2.1.1
Enzymes of unknown structure
Kaempferol
Flavonols metabolism
O-methylated flavonoids metabolism